Frank "Frankie" Kimmel II (born August 26, 1990) is an American professional stock car racing spotter and former driver. He is the son of 10-time ARCA Menards Series champion Frank Kimmel, and the cousin of current ARCA driver Will Kimmel. He is currently the spotter of the No. 99 Chevrolet Camaro ZL1 driven by Daniel Suárez for Trackhouse Racing Team.

Racing career
Kimmel first started racing at the age of 8, driving mini cup cars. He also raced frequently at Salem Speedway, winning the rookie of the year titles in the street-stock division in 2007 before winning the championship in the division in 2008. Kimmel would later move up to super-stock division and won the championship in the category in 2009.

Kimmel would make his ARCA Racing Series debut in 2010 driving for Wayne Hixson at Salem Speedway, finishing 29th after running only 10 laps due to a rear end failure. He would return to the series a year later, driving three races, including both Salem events, and achieved his first top-10 finish in the latter Salem race, finishing 7th. He would make infrequent starts in the series for the next few years after that (including separate starts for Venturini Motorsports), earning two more top-10 finishes, with his last start coming in 2017.

Spotting career
Kimmel first began serving as a spotter for various drivers whenever they needed a spotter, but his first major foray would come when he was spotting for his father Frank at the ARCA race at Berlin Raceway where the elder Kimmel would finish third in the race. He would later serve as a spotter for Christian Eckes in the inaugural CARS Tour race at Southern National Motorsports Park.

In 2022, Kimmel would join Trackhouse Racing Team and serve as the spotter for Daniel Suárez, who would win the 2022 Toyota/Save Mart 350 at Sonoma Raceway that year.

Personal life
Kimmel attended and graduated from University of North Carolina–Charlotte in 2015 with an engineering degree.

Motorsports career results

ARCA Racing Series
(key) (Bold – Pole position awarded by qualifying time. Italics – Pole position earned by points standings or practice time. * – Most laps led.)

References

External links
 

1990 births
Living people
NASCAR drivers
ARCA Menards Series drivers
Racing drivers from Indiana
People from Clark County, Indiana